Michael A. Grinston (born 1968) is a member of the United States Army and the current Sergeant Major of the Army. Prior to his current position, he served as the senior enlisted leader for the United States Army Forces Command.

Military career
This work incorporates material in the public domain in the United States because it is a work of the United States Federal Government under the terms of Title 17, Chapter 1, Section 105 of the US Code.

Grinston is a native of Jasper, Alabama, and enlisted in the United States Army in October 1987. He attended Basic Training and Advanced Individual Training as an artilleryman at Fort Sill, Oklahoma. Grinston's deployments include Operations Desert Storm and Desert Shield, Iraqi Freedom, New Dawn, Inherent Resolve, Enduring Freedom, and Kosovo.

Grinston has been assigned to: 1st Battalion, 84th Field Artillery Regiment at Fort Lewis, Washington; 2nd Battalion, 320th Field Artillery Regiment at Fort Campbell, Kentucky; two tours at Ledward Barracks in Schweinfurt, Germany with the 5th Battalion, 41st Field Artillery Regiment and 1st Battalion, 7th Field Artillery Regiment; 1st Battalion, 39th Field Artillery Regiment at Fort Bragg, North Carolina; 1st Battalion, 22nd Field Artillery Regiment at Fort Sill, Oklahoma; 319th Field Artillery Regiment; and 1st Battalion, 508th Infantry Regiment and 2nd Battalion, 503rd Infantry Regiment at Caserma Ederle in Vicenza, Italy. His service as a command sergeant major (CSM) includes assignments as a battalion CSM with 2nd Battalion, 15th Field Artillery Regiment at Fort Drum, New York, Observer Controller CSM at Hohenfels, Germany, Brigade CSM 170th Infantry Brigade in Baumholder, Germany, brigade CSM 4th Brigade, 101st Airborne Division at Fort Campbell, Kentucky, 1st Infantry Division CSM at Fort Riley, Kansas, and I Corps at Joint Base Lewis–McChord, Washington. As the 1st Infantry Division CSM, Grinston served as the senior enlisted leader for the army's first deployment of a division headquarters in support of Operation Inherent Resolve. He also served as the command sergeant major for United States Army Forces Command.

Grinston was sworn in as the 16th Sergeant Major of the Army on August 9, 2019. As the Sergeant Major of the Army, Grinston is the Army Chief of Staff's personal adviser on matters affecting the enlisted force. He devotes the majority of his time traveling throughout the army to observe training and interact with soldiers and their families. He sits on a variety of councils and boards that make decisions affecting enlisted soldiers and their families and routinely invited to testify before Congress. Grinston is the public face of the army's Non-commissioned Officer Corps, representing the NCO Corps to the American people in the media and through business and community engagements.

Grinston's military education includes all levels of the Non-commissioned Officer Education System. He is a graduate of Ranger School, Airborne School, Drill Sergeant School, Air Assault School, How the Army Runs Course, the Equal Opportunity Leaders Course and the Keystone Course. Grinston holds a Bachelor of Arts in Business Administration from the University of Maryland Global Campus.

Grinston will retire in August 2023, after handing over to Command Sergeant Major Michael R. Weimer, formerly Command Sergeant Major, U.S. Army Special Operations Command.

Personal life 
SMA Grinston was born to a black father and a white mother. They divorced when he was three years old. He is married to Alexandra Grinston and they are the parents of two children.

Awards and decorations

References

External links

Official biography as Sergeant Major of the Army

United States Army personnel of the Gulf War
United States Army personnel of the Iraq War
United States Army personnel of the War in Afghanistan (2001–2021)
Living people
Military personnel from Indiana
Recipients of the Distinguished Service Medal (US Army)
Recipients of the Defense Superior Service Medal
Recipients of the Legion of Merit
Sergeants Major of the Army
University of Maryland Global Campus alumni
1968 births
African-American United States Army personnel